Mavretič is a surname. Notable people with the surname include:
Anton Mavretič (1934–2019), Slovenian electrical engineer
Josephus L. Mavretic (born 1934), American politician from North Carolina
Til Mavretič (born 1997), Slovenian footballer